Ani Cordero (born 1974) is a Puerto Rican vocalist, drummer, guitarist, and songwriter.

Biography
Cordero was born Ana Marieli Cordero Garcia in Boston, Massachusetts. Since 1999, she has resided in Brooklyn, New York.

Cordero's work in music began in her teen years in Atlanta, Georgia. She has performed as a solo artist as well as a number of bands, including Cordero, her bilingual rock group with husband and drummer Chris Verene. She has recorded and toured both nationally and internationally.

From the 1980s until 2009, Cordero performed with Man or Astro-man?, Dean and Britta, Josh Joplin Group, Angels of Light, Bee and Flower, and #1 Family Mover. Between 2010 and 2013, she performed with Os Mutantes, Rasputina, Cordero, Tuff Sunshine, and Pistolera, which she helped create.

In 2014, Cordero released her first solo album, Recordar, consisting of covers of Latin American protest songs. In 2017, she released a second solo album, Querido Mundo.
Her third album, El Machete, came out in 2019.

Activism
In 2017, Cordero and Raquel Berrios from the band Buscabulla formed a nonprofit activist organization called PRIMA (Puerto Rico Independent Musicians and Artists). The PRIMA Fund was established to provide emergency assistance to musicians and artists in Puerto Rico after the devastating effects of hurricanes Irma and Maria. The organization has given over seventy grants and organized multiple concerts and events.

Discography

References

External links
 
 

1974 births
Living people
Musicians from Boston
American people of Puerto Rican descent
Puerto Rican multi-instrumentalists
Musicians from Brooklyn
Musicians from Atlanta
Os Mutantes members